Arkansas Highway 60 (AR 60, Ark. 60, Hwy. 60) is a state highway that exists in five separate sections in Arkansas. The longest and most well-known segment of  runs from Highway 28 in Plainview east to U.S. Route 65B (US 65B) in Conway. A segment in western Logan County of  begins at the Old Highway 10 at the Sebastian County line and runs east to Highway 10. A third segment of  begins at Highway 252 near Lavaca and runs east to Highway 41 at Peter Pender. A fourth segment runs  from US 64 and runs across Interstate 40/Interstate 540 (I-40/I-540) to Highway 282. A fifth route of  begins at Highway 282 near Rudy and runs north to County Road 23 (CR 23).

Route description

Crawford County

Rudy to CR 23
The route runs north from Highway 282 at Rudy to terminate at Crawford County Road 23.

US 64 to Highway 282
The route runs north from US 64 over Interstate 40 to terminate at Highway 282.

This segment is the only section of Highway 60 that is signed north-south, as opposed to the rest of the highway, which is signed east-west.

Sebastian / Franklin counties
The westernmost  is located in Sebastian County, with the remaining  in Franklin County. The route runs east from Highway 217 to terminate at Highway 41 at Peter Pender.

Logan County
The route runs east from the Sebastian County line to Highway 10 west of Booneville

Main segment
AR 60 begins at an intersection with AR 28 in Plainview.

The route then intersects AR 7 and runs parallel with the Fourche La Fave River and passes through Nimrod. It runs east for another  until it intersects the northern terminus of AR 155. Then AR 60 continues east towards Houston.

The highway then proceeds northeast after splitting from AR 113 and crosses over the Arkansas River before entering Conway. It runs east for about  before reaching its eastern terminus at US Route 65 Business.

Major intersections

See also

 List of state highways in Arkansas

References

External links

060
Transportation in Crawford County, Arkansas
Transportation in Faulkner County, Arkansas
Transportation in Franklin County, Arkansas
Transportation in Logan County, Arkansas
Transportation in Perry County, Arkansas
Transportation in Sebastian County, Arkansas
Transportation in Yell County, Arkansas